Gary Lee Andersen (born February 19, 1964) is an American football coach who was most recently head football coach at Utah State University. Andersen has also been the head football coach of Southern Utah (2003), Wisconsin (2013–2014), and Oregon State (2015–2017). He served three years as the defensive coordinator at Utah, where he coached the 2008 Utes team that went undefeated and beat Alabama in the Sugar Bowl to finish the season ranked second in the nation. He is currently an analyst at Weber State.

Playing career
Andersen began his football career playing at Cottonwood High School, where he lettered in football for two years. After high school, he played center at Ricks College (now Brigham Young University–Idaho) in Rexburg, Idaho, for two seasons. As a freshman he was second team All-Conference and Ricks finished the season ranked fourth in the nation. In 1984, he was a First Team All-America selection and team captain as he helped Ricks to a number two ranking in the nation. He transferred to the University of Utah in Salt Lake City, where he lettered two years for the Utes and graduated in 1986 with a bachelor's degree in political science.

Coaching career

Utah
Andersen returned to his alma mater in 1997, when he was hired by Ron McBride, his former offensive line coach with the Utes, to be defensive tackles coach. After McBride was fired as Utah's head coach at the end of the 2002 season, he left to be head coach at Southern Utah University. Andersen only spent one season with the Thunderbirds and returned to Utah in 2004 when he was hired by Urban Meyer as the defensive line coach. He was the assistant head coach, defensive coordinator and defensive line coach from 2005 to 2008 and was a 2008 finalist for the Broyles Award, given annually to the nation's top college football assistant coach.

First stint at Utah State
Andersen was the head coach at Utah State for four seasons, beginning with 4–8 records in 2009 and 2010. His first winning season at Utah State came in 2011 (7–6) and his fourth and final year was the most successful, as the 2012 Aggies won 11 games and lost only two (the two losses were by 2 and 3 points against Wisconsin and BYU, respectively), and finished #16 in the final AP poll.

Wisconsin
Andersen was introduced as the new head coach at Wisconsin (which beat Utah State in an early season game in 2012) on December 21, 2012 to replace Bret Bielema, who left for Arkansas. After Andersen decided to leave Utah State for the Wisconsin job, he called every one of his players at Utah State individually to inform them personally of his decision. In 2013, Andersen's first win as a Wisconsin coach was a 45–0 win against Massachusetts.  Andersen's final 2013 record was 9–4.

The 2014 regular season ended with the Badgers taking 1st place in the West division with a 10–2 record. Wisconsin played Ohio State for the conference title in the 2014 Big Ten Championship Game where the Badgers lost to Ohio State 59–0. Andersen left Wisconsin four days later, having taken the vacant head coaching position at Oregon State. Andersen cited family as his rationale for taking the Oregon State position while it was reported by some media outlets, such as Fox Sports and Sports Illustrated, that Andersen was frustrated with Wisconsin's high admissions standards for athletes. Those reports turned out to be accurate, and were confirmed by Andersen in January 2015.

Andersen had to pay a $3 million buyout for departing within the first two years of his contract, which was set through January 2019.

Oregon State
Andersen was announced as the new head coach of Oregon State on December 10, 2014. Andersen replaced the previous coach at Oregon State, Mike Riley, who left for the same position at Nebraska. On October 9, 2017, Andersen and Oregon State football parted ways with him forgoing $12 million left on his contract.

Return to Utah
On January 2, 2018 it was announced that Andersen would be returning to Utah for a 3rd time as an associate head coach and defensive assistant.

Second stint at Utah State
On December 9, 2018, Andersen was named head coach at Utah State for the second time, replacing the man who replaced him six years earlier in Matt Wells, who left for the Texas Tech head coaching job. Utah State fired Andersen on November 7, 2020, after the team started 0–3.

Head coaching record

Notes

References

External links
 Utah State profile
 Oregon State profile

1964 births
Living people
American football centers
Idaho State Bengals football coaches
Northern Arizona Lumberjacks football coaches
Oregon State Beavers football coaches
Ricks Vikings football coaches
Ricks Vikings football players
Southeastern Louisiana Lions football coaches
Southern Utah Thunderbirds football coaches
Utah State Aggies football coaches
Utah Utes football coaches
Utah Utes football players
Weber State Wildcats football coaches
Wisconsin Badgers football coaches
High school football coaches in Utah
Cottonwood High School (Murray, Utah) alumni
People from Murray, Utah
Coaches of American football from Utah
Players of American football from Salt Lake City